Adailou is a town in the Tadjoura region of Djibouti. It sprawls on a wide basin surrounded by granitic mountains on all sides. Adailou has one of the mildest climates in Djibouti, which is not always passable during the rainy season.

Overview
Adaylou is one of the largest villages in the Tadjourah region north of Djibouti. According to tradition, the village is where the ancestor of Adaal, Haral-Maahis, gave birth to his lineage.

Demographics
The majority of the population of Adailou is Afars.

Economy
One of the distinctive features of Adailou countryside is the widespread growing of vegetables. Many agriculture are located throughout the town.

Climate
Known for its mild climate, Adailou is unusual like Airolaf and Randa in hosting a large camp in the summer, during which life in Tadjoura and Djibouti City is difficult because of the heat. Summers are hot with June being the hottest month, averaging  during the day and  during the night. The town has its dry season from April through to May.

Adailou has overall  a hot semi-arid climate (BSh) in Köppen-Geiger system.

References

Populated places in Djibouti
Tadjourah Region